"Gossip" is the first single from Lil Wayne's EP The Leak. The single was officially released December 18, 2007 to the iTunes Store. The song contains samples of "Stop! in the Name of Love" as performed by Margie Joseph.

Music video
Whilst performing the song in concert at the House of Blues in San Diego, California, American music video director and editor Matt Alonzo filmed Wayne's performance and later edited it for release. The video was uploaded on February 1, 2008 through Alonzo's YouTube account.

Charts

References

2007 singles
2007 songs
Lil Wayne songs
Cash Money Records singles
Songs written by Lil Wayne